Salandy is a surname. Notable people with the surname include:

Giselle Salandy (1987–2009), Trinidadian professional boxer
Marina Salandy-Brown, Trinidadian journalist, broadcaster, and cultural activist

See also
Saland (disambiguation)